Mount Strahan is a mountain located on the West Coast Range in the West Coast region of Tasmania, Australia.

The mountain was named by Thomas Bather Moore in honour of Sir George Strahan, a Governor of Tasmania.

References

Further reading
 
 

Macquarie Harbour
Strahan, Mount